Othman al-Ghanmi (born 1958) is the Interior Minister of Iraq since May 2020. He is a former officer in the Iraqi Army and its chief of staff from 2017 to 2020. In 2014 he was appointed deputy chief of staff, having formerly led the Mid Euphrates Command. On 27 July 2019, he received the Legion of Merit from the United States Armed Forces and became first Iraqi citizen to receive this award.

References

Iraqi generals
Living people
People of the War in Iraq (2013–2017)
1958 births